Prosser Brook is a dispersed Canadian rural community located in the Elgin Parish of Albert County, New Brunswick.

Located approximately 4 km southeast of Parkindale and Route 895, Prosser Brook is home to the Kent Hills Wind Farm, a series of large windmills situated around 10 kilometers southwest of the community.

History

Notable people

See also
List of communities in New Brunswick

Neighbouring communities
Elgin
Parkindale

References

Communities in Albert County, New Brunswick